Men at Work: Miami is a 2020 Dutch comedy film directed by Johan Nijenhuis. The film won the Golden Film award after having sold 100,000 tickets. It was the second highest-grossing Dutch film of 2020. It was also the third best visited Dutch film of 2020.

Plot 

Jorrit (Jim Bakkum) and Bas (Martijn Fischer) decide to open a strip club in Miami. Together with Thijs (Juvat Westendorp) and Boris (Malik Mohammed) they begin work to renovate the club and to earn money by performing as strippers themselves.

References

External links 
 

2020 films
Dutch romantic comedy films
2020s Dutch-language films
2020s English-language films
Films directed by Johan Nijenhuis
Films about striptease
2020 multilingual films
Dutch multilingual films